The 2004 Summer Olympics Torch Relay took the Olympic Flame across every habitable continent, returning to Athens, Greece. Every city which had hosted, will host, or coincidentally elected to host the Summer Olympics, the Winter Olympics and the Youth Olympics was revisited by the torch, as well as several other cities chosen for their international importance. The main reason why the torch relay went around the world was to highlight the fact that the Olympic Games were started in Greece (in ancient times) and in modern times have been held around the world and then took place in Greece in 2004. 

The relay was the first time the Olympic flame had travelled to Africa and South America. The flame was transported from country to country aboard a specially-equipped Boeing 747 leased from Atlanta Icelandic (Registration TF-ARO) called Zeus. On board the flame was carried and burned continuously in specially modified miners lamps.

Route in Greece (first phase)
25 March:
Olympia, Elis, Pyrgos, Andritsaina
26 March:
Megalopolis, Dorio, Kopanaki, Kyparissia, Filiatra, Gargalianoi, Pylos
27 March:
Methoni, Koroni, Petalidi, Messini, Valira, Meligalas, Kalamata
28 March:
Mystras, Gytheio
29 March:
Sparta, Tegea, Tripoli
30 March:
Nemea, Mycenae, Argos, Nafplio, Epidaurus
31 March:
Kranidi, Spetses, Hydra, Poros, Aegina, Salamina, Panathenaic Stadium

International Route
The International Leg of the 2004 Olympic Torch Relay officially began on 4 June 2004, when the flame touched down in Sydney, Australia, previous host city of the 2000 Summer Olympics.

Route in Oceania

Route in Asia

Route in Africa

Route in America

Route in Europe (excluding Greece) 

The International Leg of the 2004 Olympic Torch Relay concluded on July 8, 2004, just over a month after it began its global journey and just over a month before the 2004 Summer Olympics opening ceremony on 13 August 2004.

Route in Greece (second phase)

9 July (day 1)
Heraklion
10 July (day 2)
Knossos, Malia, Agios Nikolaos, Sitia
11 July (day 3)
Ierapetra, Pyrgos, Agia Galini
12 July (day 4)
Spili, Rethymno, Chania
13 July (day 5)
Karpathos, Kalymnos, Kos, Kastellorizo, Rhodes
14 July (day 6)
Santorini, Sifnos, Paros, Naxos, Mykonos, Syros
15 July (day 7)
Tinos, Andros, Samos, Chios, Oinousses, Mytilene
16 July (day 8)
Lemnos, Thasos, Samothrace
17 July (day 9)
Orestiada, Didymoteicho, Soufli, Feres, Alexandroupoli
18 July (day 10)
Sapes, Komotini, Lake Vistonida, Abdera, Xanthi
19 July (day 11)
Chrysoupoli, Kavala, Philippi
20 July (day 12)
Drama, Alistrati, Nea Zichni, Serres
21 July (day 13)
Sidirokastro, Vyroneia, Doirani, Kato Poroia, Kilkis
22 July (day 14)
Langadas, Polygyros
23 July (day 15)
Moudania, Triglia, Epanomi, Michaniona, Thermi, Thessaloniki
24 July (day 16)
Pella, Giannitsa, Alexandreia, Litochoro, Dion
25 July (day 17)
Katerini, Kolindros, Aiginio, Meliki, Vergina
26 July (day 18)
Veria, Naousa, Skydra, Edessa, Florina
27 July (day 19)
Psarades, Amyntaio, Ptolemaida, Kozani
28 July (day 20)
Grevena, Siatista, Kastoria
29 July (day 21)
Eptachori, Konitsa, Kalpaki, Dodoni, Ioannina
30 July (day 22)
Mikro Peristeri, Metsovo, Kalabaka
31 July (day 23)
Trikala, Karditsa, Larissa, Nea Ionia, Volos
1 August (day 24)
Stylida, Lamia, Karpenisi, Skopelos, Skiathos
2 August (day 25)
Kymi, Aliveri, Amarynthos, Chalcis
3 August (day 26)
Aliartos, Livadia, Arachova, Delphi
4 August (day 27)
Amfissa, Itea, Galaxidi, Nafpaktos, Zakynthos
5 August (day 28):
Argostoli, Ithaca, Astakos, Lefkada, Corfu
6 August (day 29):
Igoumenitsa, Syvota, Parga, Preveza
7 August (day 30):
Arta, Menidi, Amfilochia, Agrinio
8 August (day 31):
Missolonghi, Rio–Antirrio bridge, Patras
9 August (day 32):
Aigio, Akrata, Xylokastro, Kiato, Corinth
10 August (day 33):
Thebes, Marathon
11 August (day 34):
Piraeus
12–13 August (days 35 & 36):
Athens

After visiting Cyprus, the Greek Leg of the Torch Relay resumed on 9 July 2004, with the flame touching down in Crete in the city of Heraklion. During the Greek Leg of the relay, the torch also made a cursory stopover in Albania when the torch was carried through a lake on the Greek-Albanian border.

Aftermath

The International Olympic Committee has indicated that, due to the success of the 2004 run, they might sanction a global circumnavigation of the flame before every succeeding Olympics. However, those plans were abandoned in March 2009 due to the protests in the international leg of the torch relay of the 2008 Summer Olympics (with an exception made for the 2010 Youth Olympic Games).

See also
2008 Summer Olympics torch relay

References

External links

Torch Relay
Olympic torch relays